Manuel "Manolo" Zambrano Díaz (born 8 March 1960) is a Spanish former football midfielder and manager.

Playing career
Born in Huelva, Andalusia, Zambrano finished his youth career at Recreativo de Huelva, and made his first-team – and La Liga – debut on 3 September 1978 at the age of only 18, coming on as a second-half substitute in a 3–0 home win against Real Zaragoza. On 18 May 1980 he scored his first professional goal, the last in a 3–1 away victory over Getafe Deportivo in the Segunda División.

Zambrano signed for neighbouring CD Málaga in summer of 1984, and scored his first goal in the top division on 30 March of the following year, opening a 1–1 home draw with RCD Español. His team was eventually relegated at the end of the season, and he signed with fellow league club Sevilla FC shortly after.

After 72 competitive matches at the Ramón Sánchez Pizjuán Stadium (three goals), Zambrano joined RC Celta de Vigo in 1987. He retired with Real Murcia in 1992 at the age of 32, mainly due to hernia injuries.

Coaching career
Zambrano started working as a coach with amateurs Olont CF, and also had lower league spells at Ayamonte CF, CD San Fernando and AD Cartaya. In 2007, he returned to his first club Recreativo, being appointed manager of the reserves.

On 4 February 2008, Zambrano replaced the fired Víctor Muñoz at the helm of the main squad. After narrowly avoiding top-flight relegation he renewed his contract on 23 May, but was dismissed on 7 October.

On 6 October 2016, Zambrano was elected Recreativo's new president.

Personal life
Zambrano's brother and son, respectively Antonio and Alejandro, were also footballers. They too represented Recreativo professionally.

Managerial statistics

References

External links

1960 births
Living people
Footballers from Huelva
Spanish footballers
Association football midfielders
La Liga players
Segunda División players
Recreativo de Huelva players
CD Málaga footballers
Sevilla FC players
RC Celta de Vigo players
Real Murcia players
Spain youth international footballers
Spanish football managers
La Liga managers
Tercera División managers
Recreativo de Huelva managers